Joe Tereshinski may refer to:

Joe Tereshinski III (born 1983), American football player
Joe Tereshinski Sr. (1923–2013), American football player